Stephon Stiles Gilmore (born September 19, 1990) is an American football cornerback for the Dallas Cowboys of the National Football League (NFL). He played college football for the South Carolina Gamecocks and was selected 10th overall by the Buffalo Bills in the 2012 NFL Draft. Gilmore spent his first five seasons with the Bills and earned Pro Bowl honors in 2016 before joining the New England Patriots. During his four seasons with the Patriots, Gilmore was named Defensive Player of the Year in 2019 after leading the league in interceptions. He also extended his Pro Bowl selections to four, received two first-team All-Pro selections, and was a member of the team that won a Super Bowl title in Super Bowl LIII. Gilmore was traded to the Carolina Panthers in 2021, where he received a fifth Pro Bowl selection, and signed with the Colts the following year.

High school career 
Gilmore attended South Pointe High School in Rock Hill, South Carolina, where he played football, basketball and ran track. In football, he was a two-way player as quarterback and defensive back, and helped his team to a perfect 15–0 record and the SCHSL AAAA Division II title as a senior. Among his teammates were DeVonte Holloman and Jadeveon Clowney. Playing quarterback on offense, Gilmore rushed for 1,331 yards and 23 touchdowns and passed for 1,771 yards with 14 scores. He earned first-team all-state honors by The State and was named an All-American by Parade and EA Sports. He was also named Mr. Football for the state of South Carolina.

In track & field, Gilmore competed as a sprinter during his junior year in 2008. He recorded a PR of 11.41 seconds in the 100 meters in the prelims of the Taco Bell Classic. At the York County Meet, he took 5th in the 200 meters, at 23.14 seconds, and placed 9th in the 400 meters, with a time of 54.94 seconds. He was also a member of the 4 × 100 m relay (43.10s) squad.

Considered a four-star recruit by Rivals.com, Gilmore was listed as the No. 2 overall prospect from South Carolina in the class of 2009. He chose South Carolina over Alabama, Tennessee, and Clemson.

College career 
Gilmore graduated from South Pointe High School in December 2008 to enroll at the University of South Carolina early, and participate in spring practice. It worked out, as he came out of spring as a starter at cornerback. Appearing in all 12 games for the Gamecocks, Gilmore was the rare true freshman to start at cornerback in the Southeastern Conference in 2009. He had 52 tackles, five tackles for loss, two sacks, and nine passes defended, which earned him Freshman All-American honors by College Football News and Phil Steele. He has occasionally appeared on offense, with a career total of 3 attempted passes (2 complete) and 6 rushes during regular season games. He also completed a 29-yard pass to Alshon Jeffery in the 4th quarter of the 2010 Chick-fil-A Bowl.

Professional career 
Gilmore was one of 37 defensive backs to attend the NFL Scouting Combine in Indianapolis, Indiana and completed all of the required combine drills. He finished second among all defensive backs in the short shuttle, tied for fourth in the 40-yard dash and the three-cone drill, finished sixth in the broad jump, and seventh in the vertical jump. On March 28, 2012, Gilmore attended South Carolina's pro day, along with Alshon Jeffery, Antonio Allen, Melvin Ingram, and 11 other prospects. He opted to stand on his combine numbers and only run positional drills for scouts and team representatives from all 32 NFL teams, including then-New York Jets' head coach Rex Ryan. At the conclusion of the pre-draft process, Gilmore was projected to be a first round pick by NFL draft experts and scouts. He was ranked the second best cornerback prospect in the draft by NFLDraftScout.com, NFL analyst Mike Mayock, and NFL analyst Adam Rank.

Buffalo Bills 
The Buffalo Bills selected Gilmore in the first round (10th overall) of the 2012 NFL Draft. He was the second cornerback selected behind Morris Claiborne and was the highest selected Gamecocks' cornerback since Dunta Robinson in 2004.

2012 season

On May 17, 2012, the Bills signed Gilmore to a four-year, $12.08 million rookie contract that is fully guaranteed and also includes a signing bonus of $7.22 million with a fifth-year option.

Gilmore entered training camp slated as the No. 1 starting cornerback, alongside Aaron Williams. Head coach Chan Gailey named Gilmore and Williams the starting cornerbacks to begin the regular season.

Gilmore made his NFL debut and first career start in the Bills' season-opener at the New York Jets and recorded five combined tackles during a 48–28 road loss. The following week, he recorded a season-high seven solo tackles in the Bills' 35–17 win against the Kansas City Chiefs. On December 9, Gilmore collected two combined tackles and recorded his first NFL interception off of Sam Bradford during a 15–12 loss to the St. Louis Rams. Gilmore finished his rookie season with 61 combined tackles (52 solo), 16 pass deflections, and an interception in 16 games.

2013 season
On April 3, 2013, Gilmore changed his jersey number from No. 27 to No. 24 after it became available due to the departure of Terrence McGee in free agency. He entered training camp slated as the starting cornerback alongside Leodis McKelvin. On August 24, Gilmore recorded five combined tackles during the Bills' third preseason game at the Washington Redskins. He left in the third quarter of the 30–17 loss after suffering an injury to his wrist. On August 26, head coach Doug Marrone announced Gilmore suffered a fractured wrist, had undergone surgery, and was expected to miss 6–8 weeks.

Gilmore returned in Week 6 and recorded three combined tackles during a 27–24 overtime loss to the Cincinnati Bengals. Three weeks later, he recorded a season-high seven combined tackles as the Bills lost to the Kansas City Chiefs by a score of 23–13. During Week 14, Gilmore made two combined tackles, two pass deflections, and intercepted Mike Glennon during a 27–6 road loss to the Tampa Bay Buccaneers.

Gilmore finished his second season with 35 combined tackles (30 solo), ten pass deflections, and two interceptions in 11 games and nine starts.

2014 season

On January 25, 2014, the Bills hired former Lions' head coach Jim Schwartz as their new defensive coordinator after Mike Pettine departed to accept the head coaching position with the Cleveland Browns. Head coach Doug Marrone named Gilmore and McKelvin the starting cornerbacks to begin the 2014 regular season.

Gilmore missed the Bills' 23–20 season-opening road victory over the Chicago Bears after sustaining a groin injury. During Week 3, he recorded a season-high six solo tackles during a 22–10 loss to the San Diego Chargers. During Week 8, Gilmore collected five combined tackles, deflected a pass, and intercepted quarterback Geno Smith during a 43–23 road victory over the New York Jets. He missed the Bills' Week 17 victory at the New England Patriots after he suffered a concussion during a 26–24 road loss to the Oakland Raiders the previous week.

Gilmore finished the 2014 season with 46 combined tackles (38 solo), six pass deflections, and three interceptions in 14 games and starts. The Bills finished second in the AFC East with a 9–7 record but did not qualify for the playoffs. On December 31, 2014, Marrone announced his resignation as the head coach of the Bills.

2015 season

On August 28, 2015, the Bills exercised the fifth-year option on Gilmore's rookie contract, paying him a salary of $11.08 million for 2016. New head coach Rex Ryan named Gilmore and Ronald Darby the starting cornerback duo to begin the regular season.

Gilmore started in the season-opener against the Indianapolis Colts and recorded a season-high six solo tackles during a 27–14 victory. During Week 5 against the Tennessee Titans, he recorded a solo tackle, a career-high four pass deflections, and an interception during a narrow 14–13 road victory. On December 6, Gilmore collected two combined tackles before leaving the 30–21 victory against the Houston Texans after suffering a shoulder injury while tackling running back Akeem Hunt. On December 16, Gilmore was placed on injured reserve for the rest of the season after he underwent surgery the previous day to repair his torn labrum.

Gilmore finished his first season under defensive coordinator Dennis Thurman with 36 solo tackles, a then career-high 18 pass deflections, and three interceptions in 12 games and starts. The Bills did not qualify for the playoffs after finishing with an 8–8 record.

2016 season
Head coach Rex Ryan retained Darby and Gilmore as the starting cornerbacks to start the  season.

During Week 2, Gilmore collected a season-high six solo tackles during a 
37–31 loss to the New York Jets. In the next game, he made three combined tackles, four pass deflections, and intercepted Arizona Cardinals' quarterback Carson Palmer twice in their 33–18 victory. This marked Gilmore's first multi-interception game of his career. During Week 11, he made six combined tackles, three pass deflections, and intercepted quarterback Andy Dalton twice during a 16–12 road victory over the Cincinnati Bengals.

On December 27, the Buffalo Bills fired head coach Rex Ryan after losing to the Miami Dolphins and falling to a 7–8 record. Running backs coach Anthony Lynn was appointed to interim head coach for the final game of the season. Gilmore was inactive for the Bills' 30–10 Week 17 road loss to the New York Jets after he sustained a concussion the previous week against the Dolphins.

Gilmore finished the 2016 season with 48 combined tackles (42 solo), 12 pass deflections, and a career-high five interceptions in 15 games and starts. On January 23, 2017, the Buffalo Bills announced that Gilmore was voted to the 2017 Pro Bowl. He also received the Ed Block Courage Award.

The Bills hired Sean McDermott to be their new head coach and he declined to franchise tag Gilmore. He entered contract negotiations with the Chicago Bears, but was unable to reach a deal.

New England Patriots 
On March 9, 2017, the New England Patriots signed Gilmore to a five-year, $65 million contract that includes $31 million guaranteed and a signing bonus of $18 million.

2017 season
Head coach Bill Belichick named Gilmore the No. 1 starting cornerback alongside Malcolm Butler.

Gilmore made his Patriots' debut in the season-opener against the Kansas City Chiefs and recorded four combined tackles and deflected a pass during a 42–27 loss. Two weeks later against the Houston Texans, he recorded his first interception as a Patriot off of Deshaun Watson in the narrow 36–33 victory. Gilmore missed three games (Weeks 6–8) after suffering a concussion during a Week 5 19–14 road victory over the Tampa Bay Buccaneers. On December 17, 2017, Gilmore recorded a career-high eight solo tackles and broke up a pass during a 27–24 road victory over the Pittsburgh Steelers.

Gilmore finished his first season with the Patriots with a career-high 50 combined tackles (47 solo), nine pass deflections, and two interceptions in 13 games and starts.

The Patriots finished atop the AFC East with a 13–3 record and received a first-round bye. On January 13, 2018, Gilmore started in his first NFL playoff game and recorded one tackle and two pass deflections as the Patriots defeated the Tennessee Titans by a score of 35–14 in the AFC Divisional round. After defeating the Jacksonville Jaguars in the AFC Championship Game by a score of 24–20, the Patriots went on to face the Philadelphia Eagles in the Super Bowl. On February 4, 2018, Gilmore started in Super Bowl LII and recorded four solo tackles and two pass deflections during the Patriots' 41–33 loss to the Philadelphia Eagles.

2018 season
Gilmore entered the 2018 season as the Patriots No. 1 cornerback alongside Eric Rowe.

During the season-opener, Gilmore recorded a season-high eight combined tackles, two pass deflections and intercepted Deshaun Watson in a 27–20 win over the Houston Texans. In Week 9 against the Green Bay Packers, he held Packers star receiver Davante Adams to two catches for 15 yards on four targets and recovered an Aaron Jones fumble early in the fourth quarter that led to the Patriots scoring 14 unanswered points in their 31–17 win. During Week 10 against the Tennessee Titans, he got his first NFL sack on Marcus Mariota in the 34–10 road loss. Two weeks later, Gilmore recorded three pass deflections and intercepted Josh McCown in a 27–13 road victory over the New York Jets. He started all 16 games, finishing the season second in the league with 20 passes defensed. He was named to his second Pro Bowl, was named first-team All-Pro, and was the highest graded cornerback in the league by Pro Football Focus.

In the Divisional Round against the Los Angeles Chargers, Gilmore recorded a team high two pass deflections and intercepted a pass from Philip Rivers that was intended for Keenan Allen in the 41–28 victory. In the AFC Championship game against the Kansas City Chiefs, he recorded one tackle in the 37–31 overtime road victory. During Super Bowl LIII against the Los Angeles Rams, Gilmore intercepted a fourth quarter throw from quarterback Jared Goff that was intended for former teammate Brandin Cooks to seal a 13–3 victory for the Patriots.

2019 season

Coming off of the best year of his career thus far, Gilmore was named the number one cornerback alongside Jason McCourty.

During Week 2 against the Miami Dolphins, Gilmore intercepted former teammate Ryan Fitzpatrick and returned it for a 50-yard touchdown as the Patriots won on the road by a score of 43–0. This was his first interception of the season and it was his first NFL pick six. In Week 6 against the New York Giants, Gilmore recorded five pass deflections and a toe tapping interception off of Daniel Jones on the sideline in the 35–14 victory. He allowed a 0.0 passer rating when targeted during the game. After the game, former Patriots' cornerback Darrelle Revis said that Gilmore is "by far the best corner in the league right now." In the next game against the New York Jets, Gilmore intercepted Sam Darnold once in the 33–0 road victory. On October 31, 2019, Gilmore was named AFC Defensive Player of the Month for October.

During Week 12 against the Dallas Cowboys, Gilmore held Pro Bowl wide receiver Amari Cooper to no catches on two targets and recorded an interception off a pass thrown by Dak Prescott intended for Cooper in the 13–9 victory. Two weeks later against the Kansas City Chiefs, Gilmore recovered a fumble forced by teammate Devin McCourty on Travis Kelce in the 23–16 loss. In the next game against the Cincinnati Bengals, Gilmore recorded two interceptions off Andy Dalton, the second of which was returned for a 65-yard pick six, during the 34–13 road victory. The last two weeks of the season saw Gilmore struggle; he allowed his first touchdown of the season against the Buffalo Bills in Week 16, a 53-yard reception by John Brown, despite the Patriots winning 24–17, then allowed DeVante Parker to catch eight passes for 137 yards during a 27–24 loss to the Dolphins.

Gilmore finished the season with 53 tackles, 20 passes defended, and a league-leading six interceptions, two of which were returned for touchdowns. He was awarded the Associated Press NFL Defensive Player of the Year Award in recognition of his excellent season. He was the first member of the New England Patriots and the first cornerback since Charles Woodson in 2009 to win the award.

2020 season
During the season-opener against the Miami Dolphins, Gilmore recorded his first interception of the season off a pass thrown by Ryan Fitzpatrick during the 21–11 win. In the next game against the Seattle Seahawks, he struggled to cover wide receiver DK Metcalf allowing 92 yards including a 54-yard touchdown in the 30–35 road loss. After a Week 4 26–10 road loss to the Kansas City Chiefs, he tested positive for COVID-19, and was placed on the reserve/COVID-19 list by the team. Gilmore was activated on October 15. In Week 15, he suffered a partially torn quad, and was placed on injured reserve on December 23. Gilmore finished the season with 37 tackles, three pass deflections, and an interception through 11 games and starts.

On August 31, 2021, Gilmore was placed on the reserve/physically unable to perform list to start the season due to the quad injury he suffered the previous season.

Carolina Panthers
Gilmore was traded to the Carolina Panthers on October 6, 2021, in exchange for a sixth-round selection in the 2023 NFL Draft. He appeared in eight games for Carolina, starting three, totaling 16 tackles and two interceptions.

Indianapolis Colts
On April 18, 2022, the Indianapolis Colts signed Gilmore to a two-year contract worth up to $23 million, with $14 million guaranteed.

Dallas Cowboys
On March 14, 2023, the Colts traded Gilmore to the Dallas Cowboys in exchange for a fifth round selection in the 2023 NFL Draft.

NFL career statistics

Regular season

Postseason

Personal life 
Gilmore is the son of Linda and Steve Gilmore. On July 12, 2014, Gilmore married his college sweetheart, Gabrielle Glenn. They have three children together, Sebastian, Gael and Gisele. Gabrielle, also an athlete, was a collegiate sprinter for University of South Carolina.

Gilmore has a younger brother named Steven who plays cornerback for Marshall.

Gilmore grew up as a fan of the Dallas Cowboys and joined the team in 2023.

References

External links 

Stephon Gilmore on Twitter
Buffalo Bills bio
South Carolina Game Cocks bio

1990 births
Living people
Under Armour All-American football players
People from Rock Hill, South Carolina
Players of American football from South Carolina
African-American players of American football
American football cornerbacks
South Carolina Gamecocks football players
Buffalo Bills players
Carolina Panthers players
Dallas Cowboys players
Indianapolis Colts players
New England Patriots players
American Conference Pro Bowl players
21st-century African-American sportspeople
National Football League Defensive Player of the Year Award winners
Ed Block Courage Award recipients